Ludhiana Municipal Corporation or Ludhiana MC, is a local body to govern mainly urban area of Ludhiana, India.  Municipal Corporation mechanism in India was introduced during British Rule with formation of municipal corporation in Madras (Chennai) in 1688, later followed by municipal corporations in Bombay (Mumbai) and Calcutta (Kolkata) by 1762. Ludhiana Municipal Corporation is headed by Mayor of city and governed by Commissioner. Ludhiana Municipal Corporation has been formed with functions to improve the infrastructure of town.

Issues
The stray cows are a menace in the Indian cities including Ludhiana. Cow attacks on pedestrians and vehicles often becomes deadly. Moving vehicles colliding with stationary cow on the road, is the frequent cause of deadly road accidents in India. In 2021, Ludhiana MC had collected a cow cess of ₹3.5 crore. Hundreds of stray cows are seen roaming in the streets on public places.

Revenue sources 

The following are the Income sources for the Corporation from the Central and State Government.

Revenue from taxes  
Following is the Tax related revenue for the corporation.

 Property tax.
 Profession tax.
 Entertainment tax.
 Grants from Central and State Government like Goods and Services Tax.
 Advertisement tax.

Revenue from non-tax sources 

Following is the Non Tax related revenue for the corporation.

 Water usage charges.
 Fees from Documentation services.
 Rent received from municipal property.
 Funds from municipal bonds.

References

External links 
 

Municipal corporations in Punjab, India
Ludhiana
Year of establishment missing